This is a list of museums in Sudan.

Museums in Sudan

See also 
 List of museums

References

 
Sudan
Museums
Museums
Sudan